Tabontabon (IPA: [tɐbon'tabon]), officially the Municipality of Tabontabon, is a 5th class municipality in the province of Leyte, Philippines. According to the 2020 census, it has a population of 11,902 people.

History
On October 17, 1953, Executive Order numbered 631 by the President carved out 11 barangays to form Tabontabon from the municipalities of Tanauan and Dagami.

On June 20, 1957, Republic Act numbered 1649, transferred barangays Capahu-an and Guingawan from the town of Dagami to Tabontabon.

Geography

Barangays
Tabontabon is politically subdivided into 16 barangays.

Climate

Economy

Demographics

Language
Tabontabon is a 100% Waray-Waray speaking municipality.

References

External links
 [ Philippine Standard Geographic Code]
Philippine Census Information
Local Governance Performance Management System

Municipalities of Leyte (province)
Establishments by Philippine executive order